The 2021 NCAA National Collegiate Women's Ice Hockey Tournament was a single-elimination tournament by eight schools to determine the national champion of women's NCAA Division I college ice hockey. The quarterfinals were played at the Erie Insurance Arena on March 15 and 16, 2021, with the Frozen Four played on March 18 and 20, 2021 at Erie Insurance Arena in Erie, Pennsylvania. Daryl Watts of the Wisconsin Badgers scored the tournament winning goal in a 2-1 overtime win against the Northeastern Huskies.

Qualifying teams 
In the sixth year under this qualification format, the winners of all four Division I conference tournaments received automatic berths to the NCAA tournament. The other four teams were selected at-large. The top four teams were then seeded.

Bracket 

Note: each * denotes one overtime period

Results

National Quarterfinals

(1) Northeastern vs. Robert Morris

(2) Wisconsin vs. Providence

(3) Ohio State vs. Boston College

(4) Colgate vs. Minnesota-Duluth

National Semifinals

(1) Northeastern vs. Minnesota-Duluth

(2) Wisconsin vs. (3) Ohio St.

National Championship

(1) Northeastern vs. (2) Wisconsin

Media

Television
ESPN had US television rights to the semifinals and national championship after entering into a multi-year contract to carry the event. The Quarterfinals were streamed on ncaa.com while ESPNU and ESPN3 carried the Women's Frozen Four and Championship.

Broadcast assignments
Quarterfinals
Scott Sudikoff and Kelly Schultz

Women's Frozen Four and Championship
 Clay Matvick and AJ Mleczko

See also 
 2021 NCAA Division I Men's Ice Hockey Tournament
 NCAA Women's Ice Hockey Tournament

References 

NCAA Women's Ice Hockey Tournament
1